The Tin Mine Falls is a cascade waterfall located in the remote Pilot Wilderness Area within the Kosciuszko National Park in the Snowy Mountains region of New South Wales, Australia. Described from top to bottom, the falls consist of non-segmented tiered cascades over bedrock with a few smaller plunges, followed by a single large plunge into a pool. The falls are recessed into a punchbowl feature making it impossible to view the entire waterfall from a single location on the ground.

Location and features 

The falls are located in remote country within the Kosciuszko National Park. The closest access point is the Cascade Fire Trail, a hiking trail that runs south from the Alpine Way, west of Thredbo Village.

Official data from Geoscience Australia list the most significant waterfalls in Australia as:
 Wallaman Falls - Queensland, 305m
 Wollomombi Falls - New South Wales,  with a  single drop
 Ellenborough Falls - New South Wales  in a single drop

Conclusions 

The estimated height of  corresponds with topography but contradicts Geoscience Australia's list of the tallest waterfalls in Australia (this would make Tin Mine Falls the 3rd highest on the continent). Unless the upper limit of the falls is fixed well upstream, to include a long section of shallow-slope non-bedrock streambed, the rumoured height of  cannot be substantiated.

See also

 List of waterfalls of New South Wales

References

 

Waterfalls of New South Wales
Cascade waterfalls
Kosciuszko National Park